Errollyn Wallen  (born April 10, 1958) is a Belize-born British composer.

Life

Errollyn Wallen moved to London with her family when she was two. While her parents moved to New York, she and her three siblings (one of whom is the trumpeter Byron Wallen) were brought up by an aunt and uncle and she was educated at a boarding school. She credits her interest in poetry and music to her uncle whom she described in an interview as "Victorian" and responsible for her taking lessons in piano.

Before studying music, she trained as a dancer at the Maureen Lyons School of Dance and the Urdang Academy, both in London. She moved to New York to further her training at the Dance Theatre of Harlem (1976-8) but later abandoned her training, turned to music composition and returned to the UK. She studied music at Goldsmiths (1981) and composition at King's College London (1983), and earned an MPhil at King's College, Cambridge. Wallen has stated that she had begun composing professionally before her studies at Cambridge University.

Compositions

Wallen's music draws on a wide range of influences, including avant-garde classical music as well as popular songwriting. Her work has been performed in leading concert halls and theatres around the world.

Her first orchestral commission was a concerto for percussion and orchestra, written for percussionist Colin Currie and premiered by him during the finals of the BBC Young Musician competition in 1994. This piece was subsequently performed at the 1998 BBC Proms, making Wallen the first black female composer to receive a performance at that festival.

Compositions include the "multi-media song cycle"Jordan Town (2001), Dervish for cello and piano (2001), La Luga for guitar quintet (2002), the opera Another America: Earth (2003) and All the Blues I See for flute and string quartet (2004).

In 2006 she co-wrote a song with the astronaut Steve MacLean while he was aboard the space shuttle STS-115.

In 2007, Gewandhaus Orchestra and the Leipzig Ballet performed her work, The Tempest, with choreography by James McMenemy. Her opera The Silent Twins, with a libretto by April De Angelis, was first performed by the Almeida Opera in 2007.

In June 2008, she had a World Premiere of Carbon 12- A Choral Symphony with the Welsh National Opera.

In 2010, her piano quintet Music for Tigers was performed at the Museum of Modern Art in New York City as part of the Summergarden concert series.

In 2012, her song Daedalus from the album Errollyn served as the opening and closing theme for the BBC drama One Night, and her "Principia", which has lyrics about science, was featured in the London Paralympics Opening Ceremony.

In 2014, Melodia Women's Choir of New York City commissioned and performed the World Premiere of Full Fathom Five.

In 2017, her work, Mighty River, which marks the bicentenary of the Abolition of the Slave Trade Act in England, was performed at the Southbank New Music Biennial.

Recordings and publication

In 2004, Wallen recorded an album of her own songs and solo piano music, entitled Errollyn. Her CDs include: The Girl In My Alphabet, Meet Me at Harold Moores, featured on the Brodsky Quartet Mood Swings alongside Björk, Sting and Elvis Costello.

Wallen's music is published by Peters Edition.

Honours and awards
Wallen was appointed Member of the Order of the British Empire (MBE) in the 2007 Birthday Honours and Commander of the Order of the British Empire (CBE) in the 2020 New Year Honours, both for services to music. She has also received an Ivors Composer Award. In 2018, she was listed as one of BBC's 100 Women. On 3 January 2022 Wallen was chosen by presenter Donald Macleod to be BBC Radio 3's Composer of the Week.

Academic appointments
In October 2020, Wallen was appointed visiting professor of composition at the Royal Conservatoire of Scotland.

References

External links

 Laura Barnett, "Portrait of the artist: Errollyn Wallen, composer", The Guardian, 29 July 2008.

1958 births
Living people
20th-century classical composers
20th-century English composers
20th-century women composers
20th-century English women musicians
21st-century classical composers
21st-century English composers
21st-century women composers
21st-century classical pianists
21st-century English women musicians
Belizean composers
Belizean pianists
Belizean emigrants to England
English classical composers
English classical pianists
English women pianists
Women classical composers
Musicians from London
Alumni of King's College London
Commanders of the Order of the British Empire
BBC 100 Women
20th-century women pianists
21st-century women pianists